Günther Steines (September 28, 1928 in Trier-Pfalzel – June 4, 1982 in Ahrweiler) was a German track and field athlete, who mainly competed in the 800 metres event.

He competed in the 4 × 400 metres relay for Germany at the 1952 Summer Olympics held in Helsinki, Finland, where he won the bronze medal with his teammates Hans Geister, Heinz Ulzheimer and Karl-Friedrich Haas. In the 800 metre final in Helsinki he placed sixth.

References

1928 births
1982 deaths
Sportspeople from Trier
German male sprinters
Olympic bronze medalists for West Germany
Athletes (track and field) at the 1952 Summer Olympics
Olympic athletes of West Germany
Medalists at the 1952 Summer Olympics
Olympic bronze medalists in athletics (track and field)